Malandra Elizabeth Burrows (born 4 November 1965) is an English actress and singer. She is best known for her long-running role as Kathy Glover in ITV soap opera Emmerdale.

Early life
Burrows' first name, Malandra, is a portmanteau of her parents' names, Malcolm and Sandra. Her mother encouraged her at an early age to begin dancing; she initially trained under Billy Pearce's mother Jean. She appeared on Yorkshire Television's Junior Showtime at the age of six. In 1974 Malandra Newman became the youngest-ever winner of New Faces, appearing on the same "all-winners" show with Les Dennis and Victoria Wood. Her interest in music continued throughout her early adolescence, and at age 13 she won the 1978 BBC Merseyside Songwriter of the Year award. She attended King David High School in Childwall.

After deciding that she wanted to be a performer, she joined the Everyman Youth Theatre in Liverpool, did classes at Liverpool Theatre School and also did productions with a local amateur dramatics company at St Peter's, in Woolton, whilst continuing to perform musically. After leaving school with eleven O-levels, she enrolled in a Liverpool drama school, where she remained for two years learning her future trade of acting – changing her surname to Burrows for registration with Equity, the British actors' union.

Career
Even before leaving drama school, Burrows played several roles on television, appearing in The Practice and Fell Tiger, as well as taking two parts in the Channel 4 soap opera Brookside - firstly Lucy Collins' schoolfriend, Sue, and then Lisa Morrissey, the girlfriend of Pat Hancock.

Emmerdale

Three months after leaving drama school, she auditioned for the role of Kathy Bates in the popular ITV soap opera Emmerdale (then known as Emmerdale Farm) and got the part. The role has been her most prominent to date. She became one of the programme's longest-running characters, remaining in the show from 1985 to 2001 and returning briefly in 2005. Kathy is remembered for being one of the most-often married characters in the soap and had a reputation for having "the kiss of death" on her men. First husband Jackie Merrick accidentally shot himself in 1989; her second marriage to Chris Tate, who uses a wheelchair, ended in 1995 when he admitted to an affair; in 1996 Kathy’s third husband Dave Glover died saving a baby he thought to be his own from a house fire as he was about to elope with his mistress Kim Tate. Kathy was even dumped at the altar by her fiancé Biff in 1999.

During her 16-year stint, Kathy was kidnapped by a diamond-thieving lord, knocked down by a horse-stealing conman, targeted by a double wife murderer who tried to drive her over a cliff, trapped in the wreckage of a bus hit by a lorry, and imprisoned for protesting against the local haulage company. Reportedly one of the soap's highest-paid stars of the time on a reputed £80,000pa, she paid the price of celebrity when a fanatical patient escaped from custody threatening to kill her; she had police protection for two months. She was axed from the soap as part of ITV's revamp of the programme. Burrows returned for three episodes for Seth Armstrong's funeral in 2005. In 2009, Burrows was asked to return to Emmerdale for Jack Sugden's funeral episodes in February, but was unable due to working in pantomime during Christmas 2008 and January 2009, which prevented her from making a return.

Pop career
Burrows has had some success in the UK Singles Chart, reaching number 11 with the song "Just This Side of Love" in 1990. She released a self-penned single "Summernight Love" (1996) on AATW/DKAM Records (No. 185 UK). This resulted in a recording contract with Warner Bros., and two more singles ("Carnival in Heaven" and "Don't Leave Me") also hit the UK charts (albeit the lower reaches: No. 49 and No. 54, respectively).

Other work
Burrows played many parts in theatre including in 1989 she starred as Nancy in Oliver Twist at the Civic Theatre, Halifax. In 2002 Burrows was a contestant on Celebrity Weakest Link and in 2004 she took part in the ITV game show Simply the Best, where she represented Leeds in a head-to-head tournament with other British cities. She then spent a year presenting a show called Soap Addicts on satellite, and then a year in the stage comedy Just Desserts touring the United Kingdom.

In 2006 she appeared on Channel 5's The All Star Talent Show, coming fifth as a Fire Eater. She starred as the Fairy during Christmas 2007, in "Sleeping Beauty" at the Pavilion Theatre, Bournemouth.

Burrows entered late into the 2006 series of I'm a Celebrity... Get Me Out of Here! on day seven. She was found hanging from a tight rope and had to be rescued as part of the trial by Matt Willis and Lauren Booth. On her first night she had to sleep in a hammock, and fell out of it. She took part in several "Bushtrucker trials" most notably one dubbed "Skyscrape". Burrows and fellow contestant Myleene Klass were required to clamber onto a seesaw platform 200 ft above the jungle floor and take turns to collect corresponding flags hanging off the edges of the platform. Each pair of flags, collected in numerical order, equalled a much needed meal for camp. She was the sixth celebrity to be evicted in a head-to-head with Dean Gaffney.

Personal life
On 25 April 2022, Burrows announced that she had been diagnosed with stage III breast cancer, and was considering having a mastectomy.

Discography

Singles
 1990 "Just This Side of Love" (YTV Records) (UK No. 11)
 1996 "Summernight Love" (DKAM Records) (UK No. 185)
 1997 "Carnival in Heaven" (Warner Bros) (UK No. 49)
 1998 "Don't Leave Me" (Warner Bros) (UK No. 54)
 2007 “ Keep on keepin’ on” (duet Marsh Newman) (Sanctuary) (Japan No. 18)
 2022 “Beauty and the Beast (Duet Marsh Newman) (Sanctuary) (Releasing August 2022)

References

External links

Interview post leaving Emmerdale

1965 births
Living people
English women singers
Actresses from Liverpool
Musicians from Liverpool
English soap opera actresses
I'm a Celebrity...Get Me Out of Here! (British TV series) participants
People from Childwall
People educated at King David High School, Liverpool